Fyodor Viktorovich Fyodorov (Russian: Фёдор Викторович Фёдоров; born June 11, 1981) is a Russian former professional ice hockey forward who last played for Lada Togliatti of the Kontinental Hockey League (KHL). He previously played in the National Hockey League (NHL) for the Vancouver Canucks and the New York Rangers. His older brother, former NHL superstar Sergei Fedorov, is the general manager of CSKA Moscow.

Playing career 

Fedorov was drafted by the Tampa Bay Lightning in the sixth round, 182nd overall, in the 1999 NHL Entry Draft. The Lightning did not sign within the two-year period of owning his rights, so he re-entered the NHL draft in 2001. He was drafted by the Vancouver Canucks in the third round (66th overall).

He played 15 NHL games with Vancouver Canucks, and 116 games with the Manitoba Moose, the minor-league affiliate of the Canucks.

On 24 March 2004, Fedorov was involved in an off-ice incident with teammate Kevin Bieksa. According to then-Canucks General Manager Brian Burke, several Moose players had gone out together when Bieksa accidentally spilled Fedorov's beer. While Bieksa apologized and offered to buy him another beer, Fedorov challenged him to a fight outside of the establishment, resulting in Bieksa knocking him down with one punch. This eventually led to Bieksa getting signed to a contract with the Canucks, where he would spend 10 seasons of his career.

On 7 October 2005, the Canucks traded Fedorov to the New York Rangers for Jozef Balej and a sixth round pick in 2008. He played just three games for the Rangers, playing mostly with their American Hockey League (AHL) affiliate, the Hartford Wolf Pack.

On 25 July 2006, he signed with Lokomotiv Yaroslavl of the Russian Superleague (RSL). Later in the 2006–07 season, he signed with the Malmö Redhawks of the Swedish Elitserien.

On 4 July 2008, Fedorov signed an NHL contract with the New Jersey Devils. Fedorov did not make the Devils' NHL roster and, after choosing not to report to AHL affiliate Lowell Devils, he was released by the team.

On 22 October 2008, Fedorov signed with Nizhnekamsk Neftekhimik of the newly formed Russian Kontinental Hockey League (KHL). He signed subsequently with Metallurg Magnitogorsk of the KHL. He played the 2011-2013 seasons with SKA Saint Petersburg, also of the KHL. During the 2013 offseason, Fedorov signed a contract with CSKA Moscow. After one season in Moscow, on 2 October 2014, Fedorov was on the move again after he signed as a free agent with HC Lada Togliatti on a one-year contract.

Career statistics

Regular season and playoffs

International

See also
 Notable families in the NHL

References

External links
 
 

1981 births
Columbia Inferno players
Hartford Wolf Pack players
HC CSKA Moscow players
HC Dynamo Moscow players
HC Lada Togliatti players
HC Neftekhimik Nizhnekamsk players
HC Spartak Moscow players
Living people
Lokomotiv Yaroslavl players
Malmö Redhawks players
Manitoba Moose players
Metallurg Magnitogorsk players
New York Rangers players
People from Apatity
Port Huron Border Cats players
Russian ice hockey left wingers
SKA Saint Petersburg players
Sudbury Wolves players
Syracuse Crunch players
Tampa Bay Lightning draft picks
Vancouver Canucks draft picks
Vancouver Canucks players
Windsor Spitfires players
Sportspeople from Murmansk Oblast